Modern equipment of the Royal Moroccan Armed Forces is a list of equipment currently in service with the Moroccan Army. Sources are the United States Excess Defense Articles (EDA) Database ,UNROCA,INSS Israel's Middle East Military Balance, World Small Arms Inventory, SIPRI Trade registres and the Military Balance in the Middle East by CSIS, and Army-Guide.

Infantry equipment

Weapons

The Royal Moroccan Army employs various individual weapons to provide light firepower at short ranges. The main weapons used by the army are the M16A2 and AK-47 variants (Chinese Type 56, Romanian AIM/AIMS, Egyptian Misr, Finnish Valmet M76, Yugoslav Zastava M70AB2) in the Southern Sector, and the G3A3, FN FAL/FN CAL and M16A1/A2/A4 in the Northern Sector. The AK-74/ AKS-74U, SAR 21, AK-103, Steyr AUG A1/A2/A3, MP5A3, M4 carbine and FN SCAR are used by different units as the Paratroopers, the Royal Guard, Security Forces and others units in the Navy and Air force.

The sidearms in the RMA are the MAB PA-15 for Active service, and Beretta 92 for specialized forces (Paratroopers, SpecForces, Security Forces, etc.)

Many units are supplemented with a variety of specialized weapons, those are the M249, HK11A1, FN Minimi, FALO-50-41, Ultimax 100, PK/PKM, RPD and RPK-74 to provide suppressive fire at the fire-team level. The M14NM and EBR are used by long-range marksmen, and the M82A1, the FR-F2, and the PGM Ultima Ratio are used by snipers. The Army also uses Automatic grenade launchers (AGLs) such as the STK 40 AGL or the Mk 47 Striker both used on VAMTACs LUVs (Light Utility Vehicles) and handled by infantry units.

Other weapons used for training, exercises or parades are :
 The TT-33 and MAC Mle 1950 handguns.
 The MAS-36, the M2, the AR70/90 and MAS-49/56 Rifles
 The M3, MAT-49 and L2A3 submachine guns.

Crew served weapons
Coaxial Machine Guns and Automatic cannons:
M240 on M60A3TTS and M1A1SA Abrams
NSV on T-72B
AA-52 on AMX-10 RC, VAB VCI and AML60/90
M73 on M60A3
M85 on M60A3
M2HB on Toyota Land Cruiser, M1025, M113A1/A2, AIFV B-C25/AIFV B-50 and VAB VTT
MG74 on SK-105 Kürassier
M1919A4 (Vektor MG4 CA) on Ratel IFV 20/90
M168 Vulcan on M163 VADS
M621 cannon on VAB VDAA TA20 and SA 341 Gazelle
M693 on VAB VCI/I Toucan I and Ratel IFV 20
M134 In use with helicopters
M60D In use with helicopters

The army uses different types of mortars for indirect fire support when heavier artillery may not be appropriate or available. The smallest of these are the 60mm M2 and MO 60. At the next higher echelon, the support can come from the 107mm M30 mortar, the 120mm M120 and MO-120-RT, or the 160mm Mortar M1943. A hundred of self-propelled mortars are also in RMA's inventory (See Below)

Anti-tank weapons
The Royal Moroccan Army employs a variety of anti-tank weapons, ranging from disposable, man-portable rockets to armored tank destroyers equipped with guided missiles.

Portable anti-tank rockets are employed by the infantry.  Recoilless rifles are still in use, often mounted on trucks or other military vehicles, but they are being replaced by more effective anti-tank guided missiles.  Tank destroyers represent the most mobile and best protected anti-tank weapons in service.  Older gun-armed vehicles are being replaced by missile-equipped vehicles.  Several of the army's infantry fighting vehicles are likewise equipped with anti-tank missiles, adding to the anti-tank weaponry available in the field.

Vehicles

Utility vehicles

The RMA's high-mobility multipurpose vehicles serves as cargo/troop carrier, weapons platform, and ambulance, among many other roles. 4000 HMMWV in different versions, 1,200 URO VAMTACs and 800 URO VAM-TL are part of RMAs inventory, which also includes various CUCVs. 378 GM Defense CUCVs (138 M1008, 188 M1009 and 52 M1028) and 278 M151s were received, and an unknown number of Santana Motor's Land Rover Model 88/106, Toyota FJ40, Jeep Auverland and Nissan Patrol ML-6 are also in service. An unknown number of ACMAT ALTV have also been purchased.

Military logistics' missions are the storage, distribution, maintenance, evacuation, and disposition of materiel, the transport of personnel, the acquisition or construction, maintenance, operation, and disposition of facilities, the acquisition or furnishing of services and Medical and health service support. It is the most important part and considered the base for the main mission of the RMA. Because of its topography and extensive range of action, the transport and resupply of troops posted in the Wall and East Frontier, where aerial transport is impossible or counterproductive, the use of land transport is primordial. The amount of active equipment is unknown, but estimations are possible. The number of medium and heavy trucks, HETs and Palletized Load Systems (PLS) purchased or in service were 250 IVECO M3-21.14 TT, ~3500 M35 and Variants, 387 M54 and variants, ~1,000 M800 series, 195 M816 Wrecker, ~160 M900 series, ~1000 TRM10000/9000 BMH and 600 ACMAT VLRA. An unknown number of Pegaso 3055, Mercedes-Benz Actros and Unimog are also in RMA's inventory. The Heavy Equipment Transport Systems (HETS) received were an unknown number of M746, 6 M747, 23 M1070, 133 M911 HETS and 100 IVECO TRACTOR. Two M1075 & M1076 Palletized load systems were also purchased.

Armoured recovery vehicles (ARV) are used to repair damaged as well as broken-down armoured vehicles during combat, or to tow them out of the danger zone for more extensive repairs. For this mission 86 M578, 10 SK-105 ARV, 4 VT1A ARV and 81 M88 Recovery Vehicles were acquired.

Military engineering vehicles are vehicles built for the construction work or for the transportation of combat engineers on the battlefield. Bulldozers are extensively used, all along with 6 M728 Combat Engineer Vehicle.

Tanks

Around 3335 tanks are in service: 150 VT-1A, 222 M1A1SA & 162 M1A2M, 148 T-72B and 427 M60A3/A3TTS Patton. M48 Pattons were retired from active service and stored as reserve with the 1991 cease-fire, the SK-105 Kürassiers had the same fate. 

It was reported in December 2022 that Morocco was transferring T-72s to Ukraine.

Armoured personnel carriers, infantry fighting vehicles and support vehicles

Artillery 
The Artillery, grouped in GARs, includes self-propelled howitzers, towed howitzers, multiple launch rocket systems and air defense systems, mortar carriers are part of the RIMZ.

The equipment includes: 300+ 155mm M109 SPH in different versions, 60 203mm M110A2 SPH, received as EDA from USA, and 100 155mm Mk F3 remain in service. Only 155mm towed howitzers are deployed all along the Moroccan Wall, that includes 140 155mm (M198, FH-70, M-1950, M114), 18 130mm (M1954) . Besides this 54 105mm (M101 and L118) are deployed in different regions.

2 Battalions of multiple launch rocket are also listed as part of RMAs inventory, the first with 36 122mm BM-21 and the second with 36 300mm AR2.

Surface to surface artillery

Air defense systems
After years of negligence of its air defense capabilities Morocco shifted its air defense strategy, investing heavily in new air defense bases and systems.

Morocco has been slowly building a multi-layered air defense system consisting of HIMAD and SHORAD systems in order to give Moroccan air space maximum protection.

Moroccan air defense system consists of the newly acquired advanced long range Chinese HIMAD systems the FD-2000B with a maximum range of 250 km range ,the chinese SKY DRAGON 50 with a maximum range of 50 km, the Barak 8 MX with multiple layers of coverage (35-150 km) , and the american Patriot PAC-3 MSE with a range of 60 km against ballistic missiles

The man-portable air-defense systems used by the infantry are the 9K32 "Strela-2" (SA-7 Grail), 9K38 "Igla" (SA-18 Grouse).

Other systems include AAG as M1939 (61-K), ZU-23-2 or M167 VADS, usually mounted on LUVs and CUCVs.

This list shows only the publicly-known air defenses .

Radars
N.B : this list does not mention all active radars in the Moroccan armed forces

Electronic Warfare 
N.B : this list does not contain all EW systems used by Morocco

References 

Military equipment of Morocco
Morocco